In the C and C++ programming languages, an #include guard, sometimes called a macro guard, header guard or file guard, is a particular construct used to avoid the problem of double inclusion when dealing with the include directive. 

The C preprocessor processes directives of the form #include <file> in a source file by locating the associated file on disk and transcluding ("including") its contents into a copy of the source file known as the translation unit, replacing the include directive in the process. The files included in this regard are generally header files, which typically contain declarations of functions and classes or structs. If certain C or C++ language constructs are defined twice, the resulting translation unit is invalid. #include guards prevent this erroneous construct from arising by the double inclusion mechanism.  

The addition of #include guards to a header file is one way to make that file idempotent. Another construct to combat double inclusion is #pragma once, which is non-standard but nearly universally supported among C and C++ compilers.

Double inclusion

Example 
The following C code demonstrates a real problem that can arise if #include guards are missing:

File "grandparent.h" 
struct foo {
    int member;
};

File "parent.h" 
#include "grandparent.h"

File "child.c" 
#include "grandparent.h"
#include "parent.h"

Result 
struct foo {
    int member;
};
struct foo {
    int member;
};Here, the file "child.c" has indirectly included two copies of the text in the header file "grandparent.h". This causes a compilation error, since the structure type foo will thus be defined twice. In C++, this would be called a violation of the one definition rule.

Use of #include guards

Example 
In this section, the same code is used with the addition of #include guards. The C preprocessor preprocesses the header files, including and further preprocessing them recursively. This will result in a correct source file, as we will see.

File "grandparent.h"
#ifndef GRANDPARENT_H
#define GRANDPARENT_H

struct foo {
    int member;
};

#endif /* GRANDPARENT_H */

File "parent.h" 
#include "grandparent.h"

File "child.c" 
#include "grandparent.h"
#include "parent.h"

Result 
struct foo {
    int member;
};Here, the first inclusion of "grandparent.h" has the macro GRANDPARENT_H defined. When "child.c" includes "grandparent.h" at the second time (while including "parent.h"), as the #ifndef test returns false, the preprocessor skips down to the #endif, thus avoiding the second definition of struct foo. The program compiles correctly.

Discussion 
Different naming conventions for the guard macro may be used by different programmers. Other common forms of the above example include GRANDPARENT_INCLUDED, CREATORSNAME_YYYYMMDD_HHMMSS (with the appropriate time information substituted), and names generated from a UUID. (However, names starting with one underscore and a capital letter or any name containing double underscore, such as _GRANDPARENT__H and __GRANDPARENT_H, are reserved to the language implementation and should not be used by the user.)

Of course, it is important to avoid duplicating the same include-guard macro name in different header files, as including the 1st will prevent the 2nd from being included, leading to the loss of any declarations, inline definitions, or other #includes in the 2nd header.

Difficulties
For #include guards to work properly, each guard must test and conditionally set a different preprocessor macro. Therefore, a project using #include guards must work out a coherent naming scheme for its include guards, and make sure its scheme doesn't conflict with that of any third-party headers it uses, or with the names of any globally visible macros.

For this reason, most C and C++ implementations provide a non-standard #pragma once directive. This directive, inserted at the top of a header file, will ensure that the file is included only once. The Objective-C language (which is a superset of C) introduced an #import directive, which works exactly like #include, except that it includes each file only once, thus obviating the need for #include guards.

Other languages
PL/I uses the %INCLUDE statement as the equivalent to C's #include directive. IBM Enterprise PL/I also supports the %XINCLUDE statement which will "incorporate external text into the source program if it has not previously been included."  This differs from the C #pragma once in that the program including the external text is responsible for specifying that duplicate text should not be included, rather than the included text itself.

It also offers an XPROCEDURE statement, similar to a PROCEDURE statement, which will ignore the second and subsequent occurrences of an XPROCEDURE with the same name,

See also
 #pragma once
C preprocessor
Circular dependency
One Definition Rule
PL/I preprocessor

References

External links
Include guard optimisation
Redundant Include Guards

C (programming language) headers